The Geroch group is an infinite-dimensional symmetry group of axisymmetric, stationary vacuum spacetimes that are solutions of Einstein's equations of general relativity.  It is generated by two non-commuting subgroups: the Matzner–Misner group (after Richard Alfred Matzner and Charles W. Misner) of linear combinations (with constant coefficients) of the two Killing vector fields associated with the spacetime's axisymmetry and stationarity, and the Ehlers group.

See also 
 Robert Geroch

Bibliography

General relativity